Pons Maar (born August 4, 1951) is an American actor, puppeteer, artist and filmmaker.

Career
His first feature film as an actor was Return to Oz (1985), in which he played the lead Wheeler; he also worked behind the scenes as a performance co-ordinator. His work on Return to Oz led to roles in other fantasy films, including The Golden Child (1986) and Masters of the Universe (1987).

Maar performed as the voice and body model for the Noid in the popular Domino's Pizza commercials of the 1980s.

Maar also worked as a performer for the entire 65-episode run of the television series Dinosaurs and co-starred in the film Theodore Rex (1995).

Recently, he served for two years as co-head of the puppeteer committee for the Screen Actors Guild (SAG).

Filmography

Film
Citizen: I'm Not Losing My Mind, I'm Giving It Away (1982)
Return to Oz (1985) - Lead Wheeler, Nome Messenger (voice), Nurse Wilson's assistant #1
The Golden Child (1986) - Fu
Masters of the Universe (1987) - Saurod
Dead Heat (1988) - Pool Zombie
The Blob (1988) - Theatre Manager
The American Scream (1988) - Ben Benziger
Theodore Rex (1995) - Theodore Rex (in-suit performer)
Monkeybone (2001) - Lead puppeteer (uncredited)
The Job (2008) - Mr. Mann
Remembering Return to Oz (2018) - Himself

Television
Straight Up (1988) - Heroin
The Simple Life (1998) - Barry the Dinosaur
Dinosaurs (1991–1994) - Roy Hess (in-suit performer), Fran Sinclair (in-suit performer; occasionally), Ansel (in-suit performer), Brigitte (in-suit performer), Chef (in-suit performer), Dr. Fricus (in-suit performer), Bert (in-suit performer), various characters
Don't Eat the Neighbours (2001–2002) - Puppeteer

Commercials
Domino's Pizza - Noid (voice)

Production work
Return to Oz (1985) (Mime movement arranger)
Raisins Sold Out: The California Raisins II (1990) (Dancer)
Theodore Rex (1995) (Character movement coordinator)
George of the Jungle (1998) (Puppeteer) (uncredited)
Species II (1998) (Creature motion supervisor)
Phantoms (1998) (Puppet coordinator)
Can of Worms (1999) (Puppeteer)
Blues Brothers 2000 (1998) (Project supervisor)
Beer Money (2001) (Additional puppeteer) (uncredited)
Buffy the Vampire Slayer (2002) (Puppeteer) (uncredited)
Don't Eat the Neighbours (2001–2002) (Puppeteer performance coordinator and casting)
Team America: World Police (Puppeteer) (uncredited)
The Job (2008) (Director, writer and editor)
Fantastic (2015) (Cinematographer)

References

External links
Q & A with actor Pons Maar

1951 births
Living people
Male actors from Florida
American male film actors
American puppeteers
20th-century American male actors
21st-century American male actors
American male voice actors